Qiwllaqucha or Qillwaqucha (Quechua qillwa, qiwlla gull, qucha lake, "gull lake", also spelled  Cceullaccoha, Cceullaccocha, Cceullacocha, Jelluacocha, Jelluajocha, Jeullacocha, Jeullajocha, Quellhuaccocha, Quellhuacocha, Quelluaccocha, Quelluacocha, Queulacocha, Queullaccocha, Queullacocha, Quiulaccocha, Quiulacocha, Quiullaccocha, Quiullacocha, also Keullacocha) may refer to:

Lakes 
 Qiwllaqucha (Abancay), a lake in the Abancay Province, Apurímac Region, Peru
 Qillwaqucha (Cajamarca), a lake at a village of the same name in the Cajamarca Region, Peru
 Qiwllaqucha (Cotabambas), a lake in the Cotabambas Province, Apurímac Region, Peru
 Qiwllaqucha (Dos de Mayo), a lake in the Dos de Mayo Province, Huánuco Region, Peru
 Qiwllaqucha (Huancavelica), a lake in the Huancavelica District, Huancavelica Province, Huancavelica Region, Peru
 Qiwllaqucha (Huánuco), a lake in the Huánuco Province, Huánuco Region, Peru
 Qiwllaqucha (Huarochirí), a lake in the Huarochirí Province, Lima Region, Peru
 Qiwllaqucha (Junín), a lake in the Junín Region, Peru
 Qiwllaqucha (Lima), a lake in the Yauyos Province, Lima Region, Peru

Mountains 
 Qiwllaqucha (Angaraes), a mountain in the Angaraes Province, Huancavelica Region, Peru
 Qiwllaqucha (Cayrán-Chaulán), a mountain on the border of the districts of Cayrán and Chaulán, Huánuco Province, Huánuco Region, Peru
 Qiwllaqucha (Chaulán), a mountain at a small lake of that name in the Chaulán District, Huánuco Province, Huánuco Region, Peru
 Qillwaqucha (Churcampa-Tayacaja), a mountain at a small lake of that name in the provinces of Churcampa and Tayacaja, Huancavelica Region, Peru
 Qiwllaqucha (Cusco), a mountain in the Cusco Region, Peru
 Qiwllaqucha (Jauja), a mountain in the Jauja Province, Junín Region, Peru
 Qiwllaqucha (Pasco), a mountain at a small lake of the same name in the Pasco Region, Peru